The Split Gates are a strait in the Adriatic Sea between the Dalmatian islands of Šolta and Brač, named after the city of Split to which they lead. Immediately north beyond the strait lies the body of water known as the Split Channel (Splitski kanal). The islet of Mrduja is located within the strait.

See also 
 Split
 Split Channel
 Dalmatia
 Brač
 Šolta

References

Adriatic Sea
Straits of Croatia
Straits of the Mediterranean Sea
Landforms of Split-Dalmatia County